Niels Shoe Meulman is a visual artist, graffiti writer, graphic designer and art director, born, raised and based in Amsterdam, Netherlands. ”Experimenting within the traditional medium of paint-on-canvas, but also unafraid to venture into other domains like conceptual installations and poetry, Niels Shoe Meulman keeps pushing the limits of the global urban contemporary art movement," writes the Museum of Graffiiti, who collected his artwork into their permanent collection, as has the Stedelijk Museum in Amsterdam and The San Francisco Museum of Modern Art, and many private collectors.

Biography
Meulman was born in Amsterdam.  He began tagging as Shoe in 1979 and was a graffiti legend by the time he was 18. In the eighties Shoe met New York artists like DONDI, Rammellzee, Haze and Quik in Amsterdam. Inspired by their New York Graffiti style he joined the graffiti crew Crime Time Kings with Bando from Paris and Mode2 from London. Together they gave a distinctive style to graffiti in Europe. He also meets Keith Haring in 1986, while Haring is staring at the wall piece "Better Times" Meulman painted on an insane asylum in Amsterdam. They hung out. Meulman recalls: “Keith drew something in my black book. Which ended up stolen, but I managed to get it back a couple of years later – but without his drawing for me. That drawing turned up at a Christie’s auction in 1994 and was bought by a French collector.”

In the 1990s, Meulman advanced his technique by apprenticing under the Dutch graphic design master Anthon Beeke (1989–1992). He ran his own design company, Caulfield & Tensing (1992–1999), with Michael Schaeffer, enabled by start up funds from Internet entrepreneur Walter de Brouwer. The advertising agency FHV BBDO took over the company, and employed Meulman as senior art director (1999–2001). Upon leaving the agency he was partner with Dennis Polak in the advertising agency Unruly. Under the name Unruly a line of luxury silk scarves was produced.

Commercial works of note include a signature shoe (sneaker) design for the British sports brand Umbro; the creative direction of the magazine WAVE; the re-styling of the Dutch television channel TMF; and packaging calligraphy for Bols Genever. In 2012 Meulman was commissioned by Louis Vuitton to feature alongside the spoken word artist yasiin bey aka Mos Def in the tribute video series Muhammad Ali – The Greatest Words. Mos Def recites Ali's poetic speeches while Meulman elaborates with painted calligraphy on the platform of a boxing ring. “When we were asked to pose as boxers in the ring for the Louis Vuitton videos, he uttered the words ‘strike a poser.’ Shoe is a painter of words.” —yasiin bey aka Mos Def.

With the avant-garde shoe design company United Nude the "Unruly Shoe" was designed, which "measures in at five inches tall and features details like laser-cut leather (which spells the words "unruly shoe"), a back zipper, and a spiked stiletto heel." Rem D. Koolhaas, creative director and co-founder of United Nude recalls: "At Art Basel Miami 2012, for the launch of the shoe collaboration dubbed NSMxUN, Shoe painted a 1984 stretched Cadillac Brougham. The original plan was for Shoe to paint a wall in Wynwood, but after we found this car, the plan became to paint it, as a painted car is the most mobile form of street art. In the following years the car was showcased in New York City and San Francisco.”

Calligraffiti
Shoe calls his art of writing Calligraffiti, an art form that fuses calligraphy and graffiti. He launched this movement in 2007 with a solo exhibition in Amsterdam under the same name. It was “a personal way to translate street work to gallery work.” Since then, his Calligraffiti pieces (signed NSM) have been seen in various international exhibitions in Europe and North America. In March, 2010 the book 'Calligraffiti - the Graphic Art of Niels Shoe Meulman' was published by From Here To Fame Publishing in Berlin. John Langdon, the ambigram artist who wrote the preface, is quoted in the book about the first time he met Shoe and saw his work: 'You are as good as me. Only I did more."

Eye Magazine, the international review of graphic design, reviewed the book in their Summer 2010 issue: “As journalist and editor Adam Eeuwens explains in his introduction, calligraffiti is a ‘curious amalgam of an ancient, refined art form fused with the raw force of modern street art … a synthesis of opposites.’ The book explores Meulman's capacity to express written comparisons in a viscerally understandable form. Pairings range from love / money to strict / loose to rural / urban – all bearing additional dimensions of visual irony and depth ... The illustrative nature of Meulman's words makes their apprehension feel less like reading than hearing: understood so quickly that they are impossible to ignore or shut out. Beyond the cacophony is a reserve of pent-up energy, an abhorrence of complacency, and a crisp exploration of contrast mediated by masterful craft.”

On the Spanish blog Hidden People Meulman explains what makes a good calligraffiti: “Directness in the whole, finesse in the details. An even balance between seeing and reading, word and image. I like it when letters, writing and language itself becomes an image or an abstraction. On the other hand, basic shapes and splats can become language. This is what my painting is about.”

In 2015 Meulman decided to emancipate the art form of Calligraffiti. In a statement released by Galerie Gabriel Rolt, the artist stated: “There are people all over the world who write/paint in a similar way, and so the art form can now flourish without me. Besides, my own painting style is getting more abstract and the term Calligraffiti no longer suits it. For the Calligraffiti Facebook page—with over half a million likes—twenty-five ambassadors will be selected to manage its online community. Together they can determine the future of the art form.”

Calligraffiti has become a worldwide phenomenon and plays a significant role within Urban Contemporary Art, sparked by Meulman's adage: “A word is an image and writing is painting.”

“It cannot be said enough, but, had it not been for Shoe and the Calligraffiti that he set into motion, there would not have been such a resurgence of lettering in the wider field of “urban art...reigniting the pursuit of style where it had been on the wane. ” writes Mode2 in 2017 on his blog.

Unruly Gallery 
In 2011 Meulman founded Unruly Gallery with Adele Renault, a gallery by artists for artists. Operating from a garage in the blue collar neighborhood Staatsliedenbuurt, Unruly Gallery's run as a physical location started in May, 2011 with a one weekend group show, and followed in quick succession with solo exhibitions of artists such as Quik, Paul du Bois-Reymond, Arno Coenen, Wayne Horse. Egs, Nug, a reunion of the Crime Time Kings, a few art fairs and multiple group shows. Since 2014 the gallery has moved exclusively to online exhibitions, with a focus on urban contemporary art forms such as Calligraffiti, Keep It Realism, Urban Surrealism, and Abstract Vandalism, presenting a platform for nearly 30 carefully curated artists to sell their works.

Abstract vandalism 
In 1986 the Dutch daily newspaper NRC Handelsblad run a full-page interview with Meulman with the headline “Ik ben een vandaal.” (I am a vandal).

In 2012 Berlin publishing house From Here to Fame published "Niels Shoe Meulman: Painter;" “an avalanche of visual poetry and poetic visuals. A story about an artist who rejected being called an artist, but (...) became a globetrotting painter after all… where street art meets abstract expressionism. Messing up book sections. Again.” It is a style he calls Abstract Vandalism.

Accompanying the release of the book, art critic Carlo McCormick had this endorsement: "The art world is a bloody mess, it takes a man with a broom like Shoe to clean it up," while fellow visual artist Shepard Fairey added: "Shoe's art harnesses the poetic tension between control and chaos in the most beautiful way."

Design professor and fellow lettering artist Peter Gilderdale writes in the introduction of the book: “In his art, the graphic designer, the calligrapher, and the tagger blend into a single entity. … Artists from Kandinsky through Jackson Pollock have played with this synesthetic overlap of sound and vision, and Shoe’s pieces similarly juxtapose multiple fields and connect multiple spheres of practice. Here gesture, culture, and concept coalesce in a complex contemporary mix that signals it as art for today.”

“When I was younger I wanted to design typefaces. But when I realised how much work that entailed, I became a calligrapher. And when I realised how much work that entailed, I became a painter. Now I realise that abstract painting is the hardest work of all. I am a painter who uses the skills of type design, lettering and calligraphy.”

In 2015 Galerie Gabriel Rolt presents the group exhibition Abstract Vandalism, curated by Meulman and with new works by Egs, Nug and Shoe. The show is accompanied by a catalogue with the same name, published by Unruly Publishing, and includes a manifesto by Meulman: “It’s my uneducated guess that half of all emerging visual artists have –at some point- used the street as a medium. To group all these artists as one movement is nonsense. True, graffiti/street art is the only undeniable art movement since pop art, but where urban attitude was once a unifier, now ideas and styles are very divided. It’s time for a separate direction we call Abstract Vandalism.”

Further reading

 Langdon, John; Eeuwens, Adam (2010). Calligraffiti, the Graphic Art of Niels Shoe Meulman. Berlin: From Here To Fame Publishing, 2010, 
 Niels Shoe Meulman, Painter. Berlin: From Here To Fame Publishing, 2012,  978-3937946443
 Meulman, Niels Shoe (2015). Abstract Vandalism, A Manifesto. Amsterdam: Unruly Publishing, 2015,  
 Shoe is My Middle Name, written paintings and painted words by Niels Shoe Meulman. Amsterdam: Overamstel Uitgevers, t/a Lebowski Publishers, 2016,

External links 

 Artist Web site: nielsshoemeulman.com
 Art Web site: calligraffiti.nl
 Gallery: unrulygallery.com

See also 
 Calligraffiti

References 

 Chalfant, Henry; Prigoff, James (1987). Spraycan Art. London: Thames & Hudson, 1987, p67.
 Caputo, Andrea (2009). All City Writers. Milan: Kitchen 93, 2009, head title design by Niels Shoe Meulman, p34, 38, 42, 46. 
 Betsky, Aaron; Eeuwens, Adam (2004). False Flat, Why Dutch Design is So Good, London: Phaidon Press, 2004, p215, 375, 378.

Notes 

1967 births
Living people
Dutch artists
Artists from Amsterdam